NZR E class could refer to one of these classes of locomotives operated by New Zealand Railways:
 NZR E class (1872)
 NZR E class (1906)
 New Zealand E class locomotive (1922)